Mladen Budiščak (8 September 1947 - 16 June 2003) was a Croatian actor. He appeared in more than ten films from 1974 to 1991.

Selected filmography

References

External links 

1947 births
2003 deaths
Croatian male film actors
Male actors from Zagreb